This is a sortable list of US Department of Defense Dependents Schools (DoDDS)/ Department of Defense Education Activity (DoDEA) that exist/existed in Germany, including dates open, mascot and school colors.

References

External links

 
 

Department of Defense Education Activity
DoDDS high
 Dodds
International schools in Germany